Neuhardenberg Solar Park is a 145-megawatt (MW) photovoltaic power plant, and was Europe's largest solar power station, located at the former Neuhardenberg military airport in Brandenburg, Germany.

In 2015 a solar battery storage facility with a rated power of 5 MW and 5 MWh capacity was added, which was commissioned in mid 2016.

See also 

Photovoltaic power stations
List of largest power stations in the world
List of photovoltaic power stations

References

External links 
 – Overflight of the Solarpark Neuhardenberg (duration: 2m09s)

Photovoltaic power stations in Germany
Economy of Brandenburg
2012 establishments in Germany